No'am (lit. Pleasantness) is a religious moshav in south-central Israel. Located in Hevel Lakhish, it falls under the jurisdiction of Shafir Regional Council.

History
The village was established in 1955 by Hapoel HaMizrachi. The first residents were Jewish immigrants from the Maghreb, most of whom were from Morocco. They were later joined by more Jewish immigrants from Iran and Iraq. It was named after the Biblical book Proverbs 3:17: The Wisdom - "Her ways are ways of pleasantness".

References

Moshavim
Religious Israeli communities
Populated places established in 1955
1955 establishments in Israel
Populated places in Southern District (Israel)
Iranian-Jewish culture in Israel
Iraqi-Jewish culture in Israel
Moroccan-Jewish culture in Israel